Fieldstown is an unincorporated community located in Amelia County, in the U.S. state of Virginia. St. John's Church is among one of many National Register of Historic Places listings located near Fieldstown.

References

Unincorporated communities in Virginia
Unincorporated communities in Amelia County, Virginia